Defending champion Oliver Campbell defeated Clarence Hobart in the challenge round, 2–6, 7–5, 7–9, 6–1, 6–2 to win the men's singles tennis title at the 1891 U.S. National Championships.

Draw

Challenge round

Finals

Earlier rounds

Section 1

Section 2

Section 3

Section 4

References 
 

Men's singles
1891